The following is a list of headmasters at Bristol Grammar School from when the school began in 1532.

References

Bristol Grammar School headmasters
Bristol Grammar School
Headmasters
Bristol Grammar School
Headmasters of Bristol Grammar School